Ronald John Johnston, OBE, FAcSS, FBA (March 30, 1941 – May 29, 2020) was a British geographer, known for elaborating his discipline's foundations, particularly its history and nature, and for his contributions to urban social geography and electoral geography. His broad scope is illustrated by the fact that he made extensive use of quantitative methods, while critically dealing with subjects of social and political relevance. Johnston authored or co-authored more than 50 books and 800 papers, and edited or co-edited a further more than 40 books (if translated and revised editions are counted separately). He edited The Dictionary of Human Geography and for the first four editions was its main editor.

Academic career
After receiving his bachelor's and master's degrees from the University of Manchester in 1962 and 1964, respectively, he moved to Monash University in Melbourne, Australia. There, Johnston obtained a PhD degree, and came in contact with what has become known as the quantitative revolution of geography. He also wrote his first paper on urban social geography during that time. From 1967–1974, he was part of the academic staff at the University of Canterbury in Christchurch, New Zealand, where his interest in electoral geography began to develop. Johnston then was appointed professor at the University of Sheffield. In 1979, Geography and Geographers, which he updated and expanded every few years, and whose various editions have been translated into four languages, was published. Johnston became co-editor of the two journals Progress in Human Geography and Environment and Planning A that same year. In 1981, the first edition of The Dictionary of Human Geography, to which Johnston contributed hundreds of articles, was published. It has maintained its status as the discipline's authoritative dictionary ever since. After serving as pro-vice-chancellor for academic affairs of the University of Sheffield, he became vice-chancellor of the University of Essex in 1992. From 1995, Johnston was a professor at the University of Bristol. He retired from the editorial boards of both Progress in Human Geography and Environment and Planning A in 2006.

Recognition
Johnston was one of the most cited geographers for decades. Among the most prestigious awards Johnston received were the Murchison Award (1985) and the Victoria Medal (1990) by the Royal Geographical Society, the Prix Vautrin Lud at the International Geography Festival 1999, and a lifetime achievement award from the Association of American Geographers (2009). Furthermore, he held honorary doctorates from the University of Essex (D.Univ. 1996), Monash University (LL.D. 1999), the University of Sheffield (Litt.D. 2002) and the University of Bath (Litt.D. 2005). He was elected a founding Academician (later renamed fellow) of the Academy of Social Sciences (FAcSS) in 1999, and was elected an ordinary fellow of the British Academy in 1999. Johnston was appointed Officer of the Order of the British Empire (OBE) in the 2011 Birthday Honours for services to scholarship.

Campanology
Johnston was an active bell-ringer. He published two books on aspects of campanology, "Change-Ringing: the English Art of Bell-Ringing" and "An Atlas of Bells", and was co-compiler of three editions of "Dove’s Guide to the Church Bells of Britain". Johnston served as ringing master of the Sheffield Cathedral Company of Ringers from 1980 to 1992, as president of the Yorkshire Association of Change Ringers from 1990 to 1992, and as president of the Central Council of Church Bell Ringers from 1993 to 1996.

Selected publications

Monographs
 Johnston, R. J. (1971): Urban Residential Patterns: An Introductory Review. London (G . Bell & Sons). 
 Johnston, R. J. (1978): Multivariate Statistical Analysis in Geography: A Primer on the General Linear Model. London (Longman). 
 Taylor, P. J. and R. J. Johnston (1979): Geography of Elections. Harmondsworth (Penguin). 
 Johnston, R. J. (1979): Geography and Geographers: Anglo-American Human Geography since 1945. London (Edward Arnold).  (7th edition announced for publication in 2010)
 Johnston, R. J. (1991): A Question of Place: Exploring the Practice of Human Geography. Blackwell (Oxford).

Edited Collections
 Johnston, R .J. et al. (eds.) (1981): The Dictionary of Human Geography. Oxford (Blackwell).  (5th edition published in 2009)
 Johnston, R. J., P. J. Taylor and Michael Watts (eds.) (1995): Geographies of Global Change: Remapping the World in the Late Twentieth Century. London (Blackwell).

Notes

References

External links
 Biography on the University of Bristol's website
 Former Essex Vice-Chancellor and outstanding geographer dies aged 79
 In Memoriam Ron Johnston
 Ron Johnston British Academy Biographical Memoir This provides a detailed biography by three researchers who had worked closely with him over many years, two of them are Fellows of the Academy.

1941 births
2020 deaths
People from Swindon
British geographers
Alumni of the University of Manchester
Academics of the University of Sheffield
People associated with the University of Essex
Academics of the University of Bristol
Recipients of the Vautrin Lud International Geography Prize
Fellows of the Academy of Social Sciences
Fellows of the British Academy
Officers of the Order of the British Empire
Victoria Medal recipients